All Kinds of Everything is an Irish popular culture-based quiz show hosted by Ryan Tubridy and featuring Mario Rosenstock. The show was broadcast on RTÉ One for two series in 2003 and 2004. The show's name is taken from Dana's song All Kinds of Everything, the winning entry from Ireland in the Eurovision Song Contest 1970.

It was a series that featured many classic television adverts and clips.

References

2003 Irish television series debuts
2004 Irish television series endings
Irish quiz shows
RTÉ original programming